The Spectacle Maker is a 1934 short film directed by John Farrow and starring Nora Cecil. It was Farrow's directorial debut. It was filmed in full three-strip Technicolor.

Plot Summary
Once upon a time, Peter, a lame boy who requires a crutch to walk, dreams of being able to dance like all the other children. His grandfather, Hans Schmidt, the village's spectacle maker, is presented with an opportunity by a mysterious man who walks into his shop: make a lens that when looked through makes everything and everyone appear beautiful, in return for his shop being filled with gold. Hans wants to oblige if only to be able to fix Peter's leg, but first Hans has to learn what beauty actually is. In consulting with the wisest source he knows, Hans is able to produce such a lens which makes everything and everyone on the surface appear beautiful on the surface, and in return he is showered with gold. Another mysterious man comes forth explaining to Hans that the spectacle is deceitful in hiding the ugliness that hides underneath, and that he should produce a lens that should bring forth the truth to the surface. Hans, once again going through the process, does produce such a lens, however at the possible expense to his life as it does expose the ugliness of the souls of some important people, namely the Duke and Duchess. In the end, the truth, in its power, may set them all free.

Cast
 Nora Cecil as Duchess 
 Harvey Clark as The Grand Duke
 Cora Sue Collins as The Little Princess
 Nigel De Brulier as The Man in Black 
 Sumner Getchell as Lens Buyer
 Angelo Rossitto as Court Jester (uncredited)
 Robert Taylor as The Duchess's Paramour

References

External links
 The Spectacle Maker at IMDb
 

1934 films
American short films
Metro-Goldwyn-Mayer short films
American fantasy films
1930s fantasy films
Films directed by John Farrow
1930s American films